James Patrick (born June 14, 1963) is a Canadian professional ice hockey coach and former player. He is currently the head coach for the Winnipeg Ice of the Western Hockey League (WHL).

Playing career
After a successful collegiate career at the University of North Dakota, Patrick represented Canada at the 1984 Winter Olympics in Sarajevo, Yugoslavia. After the Olympics, Patrick signed his first professional contract on March 5, 1984 with the New York Rangers, and made his NHL debut two days later in Minnesota. Patrick scored his first NHL goal on March 17, 1984, in Philadelphia. Patrick enjoyed ten productive seasons in New York before being traded to the Hartford Whalers and then to the Calgary Flames during the 1993–94 season.

After several years in Calgary, Patrick signed with the Buffalo Sabres as a free agent after the 1997–98 season. Though he was chosen to play in the 1987 Canada Cup and many other international events, Patrick was never selected to the NHL All Star game. He ranks high among defencemen in both all times game played (1280) and total points (639). Patrick set a record (since broken) for career games played by a Team Canada player with 40 career games, breaking the previous record of 37 games in 2002. On September 8, 2005, Patrick announced his retirement from the NHL at the age of 42. He was immediately named to the Sabres' staff as a skill development coach. However, he left the team before the season to play in Germany's Deutsche Eishockey Liga with the Frankfurt Lions.

Coaching career
Patrick joined the Buffalo Sabres as assistant coach in 2006. He made his debut as head coach in February 2012, when Lindy Ruff was incapable of coaching due to an injury. After Ruff was fired in February 2013, Patrick remained with the Sabres' coaching staff until the end of the season, and then was let go.

After the 2013 season he re-joined Ruff as an assistant coach with the Dallas Stars. At the end of the 2016–17 regular season, Patrick was let go when the Stars elected not to renew Ruff's expiring contract, after the team missed the playoffs.

On June 6, 2017, it was announced that Patrick was named as the head coach for the Kootenay Ice of the Western Hockey League (WHL).

Personal life
Patrick is half Ukrainian and half English. His father, Stephen (born as Stepan Patrebka), was the child of Ukrainian immigrants from the Lviv region, and played for the Winnipeg Blue Bombers of the Canadian Football League. Patrick is the brother of Steve and the uncle of Nolan Patrick.

In 2014, Patrick was charged with assault stemming from a domestic incident, while working as an assistant coach for the Dallas Stars.

Career statistics

Regular season and playoffs

International

Coaching record

Awards and honours

Canadian Tier II Player of Year (1981)
SJHL All-Star First Team (1981)
SJHL Championship (1981)
Centennial Cup First Team All-Star (1981)
Centennial Cup Championship (1981)
WCHA Freshman of the Year (1982)
NCAA Championship (1982)
Played in the World Junior Championships for Team Canada (1983)
Played in the World Championships for Team Canada (1983, 1987, 1989, 1998, & 2002)
Played in the Sarajevo Olympics for Team Canada (1984)
Played in the Canada Cup Tournament for Team Canada (1987)
Honoured Member of the Manitoba Hockey Hall of Fame
 Member of the Manitoba Sports Hall of Fame (2008)
 In the 2009 book 100 Ranger Greats, was ranked No. 44 all-time of the 901 New York Rangers who had played during the team's first 82 seasons

See also
List of NHL players with 1000 games played

References

External links

Profile at hockeydraftcentral.com
James Patrick's biography at Manitoba Hockey Hall of Fame
Manitoba Sports Hall of Fame

1963 births
Living people
AHCA Division I men's ice hockey All-Americans
Buffalo Sabres captains
Buffalo Sabres coaches
Buffalo Sabres players
Calgary Flames players
Canadian expatriate ice hockey players in Germany
Canadian ice hockey coaches
Canadian ice hockey defencemen
Canadian people of Ukrainian descent
Dallas Stars coaches
Frankfurt Lions players
Hartford Whalers players
Ice hockey players at the 1984 Winter Olympics
Kootenay Ice coaches
National Hockey League assistant coaches
National Hockey League first-round draft picks
NCAA men's ice hockey national champions
New York Rangers draft picks
New York Rangers players
North Dakota Fighting Hawks men's ice hockey players
Olympic ice hockey players of Canada
Ice hockey people from Winnipeg